"Love Illumination" is a song by Scottish indie rock band Franz Ferdinand. It was released as the second single from the band's fourth studio album, Right Thoughts, Right Words, Right Action, on 27 June 2013.

Composition
"Love Illumination" features indie rock, dance-rock, new wave, glam rock, and funk. Nick McCarthy stated that he originally thought the guitar riff, conceived by Alex Kapranos, was "too rocky", but later enjoyed playing it. The song was written and recorded during a weekend session at McCarthy's Sausage Studio. About the song's meaning, Kapranos stated: We all feel as sensitive to satisfaction at times. We can look outside us and see nothing but destruction, avarice, and boredom. So we look to find that love where we can find it. Some people look to Hollywood, some people look to Blackpool and the bright lights of Blackpool. That's probably where I would look.

Critical reception
The song's lyrics have been described as "a cheeky testament to their writing abilities".

Music video
The music video for the song was released on 24 July 2013 onto the band's Vevo channel on YouTube. It was directed by Tim Saccenti. The video features psychedelic transitions between clips, band members with animal masks and people dancing randomly with some references of Triadisches Ballett from Buahaus.

The video was called "self-consciously odd" by Sarah Bella.

Track listing
Digital download
 "Love Illumination" (Kapranos / McCarthy) - 3:44

7" (RUG533)
 "Right Action" (Alex Kapranos / Nick McCarthy / Robert Hardy) - 3:01
 "Love Illumination" (Kapranos / McCarthy) - 3:44

UK digital download
 "Right Action" (Kapranos / McCarthy / Hardy) - 3:01
 "Love Illumination" (Kapranos / McCarthy) - 3:44
 "Right Action" (Live) (Kapranos / McCarthy / Hardy) - 3:05
 "Stand on the Horizon" (Live) (Kapranos / McCarthy) - 4:14
 Live versions taken from Right Thoughts, Right Words, Right Action deluxe edition bonus disc

Personnel
Personnel adapted from the album's liner notes

Franz Ferdinand
Alex Kapranos – lead vocals, guitar, composing, mixing, pre-production, and production
Nick McCarthy – backing vocals, rhythm guitar, and keyboards
Bob Hardy – bass guitar
Paul Thomson – drums

Production personnel
Gus Asphalt - saxophone
Ch4in$ - pre-production
Daftdog - brass
Mark Ralph - engineering and mixing

Charts

References

2013 singles
2013 songs
Franz Ferdinand (band) songs
Glam rock songs
Songs written by Alex Kapranos
Songs written by Nick McCarthy
Domino Recording Company singles